Marble Hall is a town in the south of the Limpopo province of South Africa. It was formerly in Mpumalanga province.

Marble Hall is a village 26 km north-west of Groblersdal and 96 km south-south-east of Mokopane on the N11 National Route. Laid out in 1942 and proclaimed a township in January 1945, it owes its development to the Marble Lime Mine. Its name is said to be an adaptation of ‘marble hole’, where fifteen varieties of marble occur.

History
While on a hunting expedition from Bethlehem, Matthew Greeff and his dog discovered a hole containing marble in 1920. In 1929 the Marble Lime Company came in to work on the deposits and then, in 1942, a town was developed and known as Materhol (Afrikaans for Matthews Hole). Soon the town's name was changed to Marble Hall.

See also
Groblersdal
Siyabuswa

References

Populated places in the Ephraim Mogale Local Municipality
Populated places established in 1942
1942 establishments in South Africa